Paychi (Quechua for Petiveria alliacea, also spelled Payche) is a  mountain in the Wansu mountain range in the Andes of Peru, about  high. It is situated in the Apurímac Region, Antabamba Province, in the districts of Antabamba and Juan Espinoza Medrano. Paychi lies northwest of Quri Waraqa and southeast of Quri Pawkara.

References 

Mountains of Peru
Mountains of Apurímac Region